Sant'Ambrogio may refer to the following entities in Italy:

 Basilica of Sant'Ambrogio, a church in the Milan
 Sant'Ambrogio, Florence, a Roman Catholic church in Florence
 Sant'Ambrogio di Torino, a municipality in the Turin
 Sant'Ambrogio di Valpolicella, a municipality in Verona, Veneto
 Sant'Ambrogio sul Garigliano, a municipality in Frosinone, Lazio

See also
 Ambrogio
 Saint-Ambroise (disambiguation)
 Saint Ambrose